Gerald Joseph Weber (February 1, 1914 – August 28, 1989) was a United States district judge of the United States District Court for the Western District of Pennsylvania.

Education and career

Born in Erie, Pennsylvania, Weber received an Artium Baccalaureus degree from Harvard University in 1936 and received his Bachelor of Laws from the University of Pennsylvania Law School in 1939. He was an Instructor at Gannon College in Erie from 1939 to 1941. He was in private law practice in Erie from 1940 to 1942. Beginning in 1942, he served in the United States Army as a Captain until 1946. From 1946 to 1947 he was a Chief of Counter-Intelligence for the United States War Department in Salzburg, Austria. After the war, he returned to private law practice in Erie from 1947 to 1964. During this period he also served as City Solicitor of Erie from 1950 to 1960.

Federal judicial service

On April 30, 1964, Weber was nominated by President Lyndon B. Johnson to a seat on the United States District Court for the Western District of Pennsylvania vacated by Judge John Wilson McIlvaine. Weber was confirmed by the United States Senate on September 15, 1964, and received his commission the same day. Weber served as Chief Judge for the District Court from 1976 to 1982. He assumed senior status on December 31, 1988 and remained active with the court until his death on August 28, 1989 in Erie.

Notable cases

Among Weber's most significant rulings was a 1981 order that consolidated several suburban Pittsburgh school districts to end a racial discrimination lawsuit. He wrote a 1971 opinion in Mayo v. Satan and His Staff.

References

Sources
 

1914 births
1989 deaths
Judges of the United States District Court for the Western District of Pennsylvania
United States district court judges appointed by Lyndon B. Johnson
20th-century American judges
People from Erie, Pennsylvania
Harvard University alumni
University of Pennsylvania Law School alumni
United States Army officers
20th-century American lawyers